Satanic Twins is a remix album by the band Of Montreal.  The album contains twelve remixes (six each) from their two previous full-length albums Satanic Panic in the Attic (2004) and The Sunlandic Twins (2005).  The album was released as a double LP and digital download. "Satanic Twins" is a portmanteau of the names of the two albums from which its remixed songs originate.

Track listing
Satanic Panic in the Attic Remixes LP
 "Disconnect the Dots (Mixel Pixel remix)" - 4:17
 "How Lester Lost His Wife (Pocket remix)" - 3:32
 "My British Tour Diary (Restiform Bodies (anticon.) remix)" - 4:00
 "Climb the Ladder (Rory Phillips Trash UK remix)" - 5:34
 "Chrissy Kiss the Corpse (Nils Lannon remix)" - 2:31
 "Rapture Rapes the Muses (DJ Dave P. and Adam Sparkles Making Time remix)" - 6:25

The Sunlandic Twins Remixes LP
 "Forecast Fascist Future (IQU remix)" - 4:56
 "The Party's Crashing Us (I Am The World Trade Center remix)" - 3:54
 "Wraith Pinned to the Mist and Other Games (Broken Spindles remix)" - 4:01
 "I Was a Landscape in Your Dream (Grizzly Bear remix)" - 4:49
 "Requiem for O.M.M.2 (United State of Electronica remix)" - 2:10
 "I Was Never Young (Supersystem remix)" - 4:02

Bonus track on digital version
"My British Tour Diary (Caro Remix)" – 5:37

Of Montreal albums
2006 remix albums
Polyvinyl Record Co. remix albums